Phillip ("Phil") George Boggs (December 29, 1949 – July 4, 1990) was a diver and Olympic gold medalist from the United States; he won the 3 m springboard event at the 1976 Summer Olympics in Montreal, Canada.

Boggs was born in Akron, Ohio, and graduated from Firestone High School in 1967. He graduated from Florida State University in 1971 and served as an officer in the U.S. Air Force for five years, leaving as a captain in 1976. He was an instructor at the U.S. Air Force Academy and graduated from the University of Michigan Law School in 1979.

Boggs was inducted in the International Swimming Hall of Fame.
 
Diagnosed with lymphoma, he died at age 40 in 1990 in Miami, Florida.

See also
 List of members of the International Swimming Hall of Fame

References

 Wallechinsky, David (2004).  The Complete Book of the Summer Olympics, Toronto: Sport Classic Books.

External links
 
 
 
 

1949 births
1990 deaths
Deaths from lymphoma
Florida State University alumni
University of Michigan Law School alumni
Divers at the 1976 Summer Olympics
Olympic gold medalists for the United States in diving
Sportspeople from Akron, Ohio
Deaths from cancer in Florida
American male divers
Medalists at the 1976 Summer Olympics
World Aquatics Championships medalists in diving
Pan American Games silver medalists for the United States
Pan American Games medalists in diving
Divers at the 1975 Pan American Games
Divers at the 1979 Pan American Games
Pan American Games bronze medalists for the United States
Medalists at the 1975 Pan American Games
Medalists at the 1979 Pan American Games